The Orlando Times is a weekly newspaper published in Orlando, Florida, and surrounding counties. The newspaper was founded by publisher Dr. Calvin Collins and several of his colleagues on July 5, 1976. According to the paper's website, the paper aims to publish African-American news from a Black perspective.

References

External links 

 Official website

Mass media in Orlando, Florida
Newspapers published in Florida
1976 establishments in Florida
African-American newspapers
Publications established in 1976